The Seidelmann 30, also called the Chesapeake 30, is an American sailboat that was designed by Bob Seidelmann as a cruiser and first built in 1977.

Production
The design was built by Seidelmann Yachts and also by Dickerson Boatbuilders, both in the United States, starting in 1977, but it is now out of production.

Design
The Seidelmann 30 is a recreational keelboat, built predominantly of fiberglass, with wood trim. It has a masthead sloop rig, an internally mounted spade-type rudder and a fixed fin keel. It displaces  and carries  of ballast.

See also
List of sailing boat types

References

Keelboats
1970s sailboat type designs
Sailing yachts
Sailboat type designs by Bob Seidelmann
Sailboat types built by Seidelmann Yachts
Sailboat types built by Dickerson Boatbuilders